The World Figure Skating Championships is an annual figure skating competition sanctioned by the International Skating Union in which figure skaters compete for the title of World Champion.

The 1953 competitions for men, ladies, pair skating, and ice dancing took place from February 8th to 15th in Davos, Switzerland.

Results

Men

Judges:
 J. D. Greig 
 Gérard Rodrigues-Henriques 
 Adolf Walker 
 Pamela Davis 
 H. Hoyoux 
 Ercole Cattaneo 
 A. J. Krupy 
 Hans Meixner 
 A. Jaisli

Ladies

Judges:
 E. Labin 
 J. D. Greig 
 Adolf Walker 
 Mollie Phillips 
 Gérard Rodrigues-Henriques 
 J. Krupy 
 A. Jaisli

Pairs

Judges:
 W. Malek 
 H. Hoyoux 
 J. D. Greig 
 Werner Rittberger 
 P. L. Borrajo 
 Elemér Terták 
 E. Finsterwald

Ice dancing

Judges:
 Hans Meixner 
 A. Voordeckers 
 Pamela Davis 
 E. Finsterwald 
 R. Sackett

Sources
 Result List provided by the ISU

World Figure Skating Championships
World Figure Skating Championships
World Figure Skating Championships
International figure skating competitions hosted by Switzerland
Sport in Davos
February 1953 sports events in Europe